Johanna of Hanau-Lichtenberg, Countess of Eberstein (1507 – 27 January 1572) was a German noblewoman, the eldest daughter of Philipp III, Count of Hanau-Lichtenberg (18 October 1482 – 15 May 1538) and Margravine Sibylle of Baden (26 April 1485 – 10 July 1518).

Life
Johanna was married on 6 November 1522 to Count Wilhelm IV of Eberstein (3 May 1497 – 1 July 1562). Her husband chaired the Reichskammergericht from 1546 to 1555. Johanna and William are mentioned several times in the Zimmern Chronicle.

She died on 27 January 1572 at Eberstein Castle in Gernsbach. Two days later, Johanna was buried in the parish church of Gernsbach. An epitaph, which shows her and her husband, can still be seen there.

Marriage and issue
She and Count Wilhelm IV of Eberstein were married on 6 November 1522, and together had the following children:
 Philip I (1523 – 11 September 1589 in Remlingen), succeeded his father as Count of Eberstein. He was an imperial councillor and governor in the Upper Alsace. He married Johanna de Bailleul, Dame de Douxlieu (d. 12 April 1565). In 1577, he was put under a legal guardian because of his "insanity".
 Anna (1524–1546)
 Elisabeth (1526–1555)
 Felicitas (1527–1565), abbess of the Ladies' Convent St. Hippolyte in Gerresheim
 Kunigunde (1528 – 13 July 1575), married to Count Froben Christoph of Zimmern (1519–1566)
 William (1529 – 3 June 1561), canon in Strasbourg, where he later also served as choirmaster and as dean, and canon in Cologne
 Sibylla (1531–1589), married Count Markus Fugger (1529 – 18 April 1597)
 Bruno (b. 1532)
 Otto (1533 – 4 December 1576, drowned in Antwerp), was a canon in Strasbourg. He later reverted to the lay state and became an imperial councillor and later Colonel.
 Anna (1536–1537)

Ancestors

See also 
 Zimmern Chronicle

References 
 M. Goltzené: Aus der Geschichte des Amtes Buchsweiler, in: Pay d’Alsace, vol. 111/112
 Klaus Lötzsch: Historische Beziehungen der Grafschaft Hanau-Lichtenberg nach Schwaben im 16. Jahrhundert. Dynastische Verbindung zum Hause Fugger – Graf Philipp IV. auf dem Reichstag zu Augsburg 1566, in: Babenhäuser Mosaik, in the series Babenhausen einst und jetzt, vol. 20, Babenhausen, 1990. p. 7 – 19
 Detlev Schwennicke: Europäische Stammtafeln: Stammtafeln zur Geschichte der europäischen Staaten, new series, vol. 12, 1992, table 29
 Reinhard Suchier: Genealogie des Hanauer Grafenhauses, in: Festschrift des Hanauer Geschichtsvereins zu seiner fünfzigjährigen Jubelfeier am 27. August 1894, Hanau, 1894

Footnotes 

1507 births
1572 deaths
16th-century German people
16th-century German women
House of Hanau